Tony Kilkenny (born 7 June 1959 in Kiltormer, County Galway) is an Irish former sportsperson. He played hurling with his local club Kiltormer and was a member of the Galway senior inter-county team in the 1980s.  His brother, Ollie, also played with Galway.

References

1961 births
Living people
Kiltormer hurlers
Galway inter-county hurlers
Connacht inter-provincial hurlers
All-Ireland Senior Hurling Championship winners